Malla is a 2004 Indian Kannada-language film written, directed, composed and enacted by Ravichandran in dual roles. The film also stars Priyanka Trivedi and Mohan Shankar. The film was produced by Ramu for his home banner Ramu Enterprises making his the first team up with Ravichandran.

The film found a widespread release across Karnataka state on 27 February 2004 and was declared a blockbuster at the box office. However, it received mixed response by the critics who claimed that the film highlights the unwanted intimacy scenes, as well as the great relationship between husband and wife, other than the romantic part of Shiva Rama Krishna, the associate of TFI Puri Jaganadh, has shown the great relationship between husband and wife that attracted woman audience to watch this movie again and again. The film is also reportedly the first to introduce the famous Kerala based traditional art Kalarippayattu in Kannada cinema. The stunt master K. D. Venkatesh was awarded in a special category at the 2003–04 Karnataka State Film Awards.

Plot 
The film is all about Malla - a florist, a Samaritan, soft-natured person beloved by people; contrast to this is his son Shiva who grows-up in goons' abode; a father who sacrifices his life for his son and at the end son taking revenge on the culprits. Malla reminds us of his earlier films Anjada Gandu and Puntanja in some sequences. This film has everything from love to trust, affection, sorrow, action, cruelty, comedy and glamour to make Malla a tasty feast for all classes. Known for unusual ideas and sets, he demonstrated them here too - he sleeps on a hand shaped bed and makes out with the beauty.

Cast
 Ravichandran as Mallikarjuna (Malla) / Shiva
 Priyanka Upendra as Priya
 Mohan Shankar as Hanuma
 Umashree
 Pavitra Lokesh
 K.S.L Swamy
K. D. Venkatesh 
Fayaz Khan 
Ultimate Shivu 
 Vijay Kashi
 Shankar Ashwath
 Lakshman Rao
Venkatesh Prasad

Production 
V. Ravichandran began working on Malla in March 2003, alongside Pandu Ranga Vittala, another film he was acting in. Malla was produced by Ramu, under his production house, while Ravichandran directed it. He stated: "The audience can expect to see the earlier Ravichandran in Malla. The film will have all gimmicks and heroisms of a Ravichandran-starrer and I want the cine-goers to take something back home after seeing the film. The film will touch the hearts of all the cine-goers. It will entertain, make people laugh and cry." He added that he would star as the eponymous lead Mallikarjuna "Malla", who has a love for flowers. He further said the film would have six tracks, and that Priyanka Upendra would star opposite him, as a girl "who comes from abroad and becomes a village girl." Ravichandran wrote the film's story and lyrics for three tracks, and co-wrote the screenplay with J. K. Bharavi, while actor Mohan Shankar wrote the dialogues.

Soundtrack
The music of the film was composed and lyrics written by Ravichandran.

References

External links
 movie review
 Sify review

2004 films
2000s romantic action films
Films scored by V. Ravichandran
Films directed by V. Ravichandran
Indian romantic action films
Kalarippayattu films
2000s Kannada-language films